The 1926 Arizona gubernatorial election took place on November 2, 1926. Despite being a Democratic year generally, Hunt barely managed to be re-elected against his Republican opponent Elias Clark. Hunt had been governor for around 11 out of the State of Arizona's 14 years, coupled with his age and with issues regarding the Colorado River Compact, he was running out of steam. Despite that Hunt narrowly prevailed and won.

Governor W. P. Hunt was sworn in for a sixth term as governor on January 3, 1927.

Democratic primary

Candidates
George W. P. Hunt, incumbent governor, former ambassador to Siam
Everett E. Ellinwood, district attorney for territorial Arizona (1893-1898), Regent for the U of A  
J. J. Cox, state senator

Results

Republican primary

Candidates
E. S. Clark, Arizona Territorial Attorney General  
Thomas Maddock, Republican nominee for Representative in 1918, and as governor in 1934

Results

General election

References

Bibliography

1926
1926 United States gubernatorial elections
Gubernatorial
November 1926 events